Vicente "Dongkoy" Yap Emano (March 31, 1943 – May 7, 2019) was a Filipino politician and was the mayor of the city of Cagayan de Oro from 1998 to 2007 and again from 2010 to 2013; he was the mayor of Tagoloan, Misamis Oriental from 1980 to 1986, governor of the province from 1986 to 1995 and Vice Mayor of Cagayan de Oro city from 2007 to 2010. His son "Bambi" is the current Governor of Misamis Oriental.

References

External links
  http://www.pia.gov.ph/?m=12&r=&y=&mo=&fi=p101201.htm&no=C2

|-

1943 births
2019 deaths
Mayors of Cagayan de Oro
Governors of Misamis Oriental
Deaths from pneumonia in the Philippines